Nogal may refer to:

Places
 Nogal, New Mexico
 Nugal, Somalia

People
 Artur Nogal (born 1990), Polish speed skater
 Mickaël Nogal (born 26 November 1990), French politician

See also